John Devereaux (born January 17, 1962) is an American former basketball player. He had a long professional career in Europe, where he played in the top leagues in Spain, Italy, France and Germany. He played college basketball at Ohio University, where as a senior he was named the Mid-American Conference Player of the Year.

Devereaux committed to Ohio out of Abraham Lincoln High School in Brooklyn, where he did not play until his junior year. He developed into a top player in the Mid-American Conference (MAC), named honorable mention all-conference as a sophomore, then first-team All-MAC as a junior and senior. He was also named MAC Player of the Year in his senior year. For his career at Ohio, he averaged 13.3 points and 8.5 rebounds for his Bobcat career.

Following the close of his college career, Devereaux was drafted by the San Antonio Spurs in the fourth round of the 1984 NBA draft (78th pick overall). He did not play in the NBA, but did have a successful career in Europe. He also played minor league basketball in the United States in the United States Basketball League for the Jersey Jammers and the Continental Basketball Association for the Columbus Horizon.

References

External links
Italian League stats
College stats @ sports-reference.com

1962 births
Living people
Abraham Lincoln High School (Brooklyn) alumni
American expatriate basketball people in France
American expatriate basketball people in Germany
American expatriate basketball people in Italy
American expatriate basketball people in Spain
American men's basketball players
Basketball players from New York City
Bayer Giants Leverkusen players
CB Valladolid players
Cholet Basket players
Columbus Horizon players
Lega Basket Serie A players
Liga ACB players
Ohio Bobcats men's basketball players
Pallacanestro Varese players
Power forwards (basketball)
San Antonio Spurs draft picks
Sportspeople from Brooklyn
United States Basketball League players